Michael Edward Borg Banks MBE (22 December 1922 – 9 February 2013) was a British soldier, adventurer, climber and author.

Early life

Banks was born in Chippenham, Wiltshire, England, on 22 December 1922. His father Humphrey Borg, an engineer, and mother Elsie (nee Millicent) worked in Malta, where Banks was schooled until returning to Chippenham when he was 14. He adopted the surname Banks by deed poll, in adulthood. Banks was a vegetarian.

Career and later life
Banks joined the Royal Marines, with a commission, in January 1942. He was a member of the British North Greenland Expedition (1952 to 1954).

He appeared as a castaway on the BBC Radio programme Desert Island Discs on 25 November 1954. He was appointed a Member of the Order of the British Empire in 1959.

In 1958, he made the first ascent of Rakaposhi with Tom Patey as part of a British-Pakistani joint forces Himalayan expedition.

At the age of 77, in May 2000, he climbed the Scottish sea stack, the Old Man of Hoy becoming the oldest person to have done so.

He died in Bristol on 9 February 2013, aged 90.

Bibliography

References

1922 births
2013 deaths
British expatriates in Malta
English mountain climbers
Members of the Order of the British Empire
Military personnel from Wiltshire
Polar explorers
People from Chippenham
Royal Marines officers
Royal Marines personnel of World War II